Chicken with Plums (French: Poulet aux prunes) is a 2004 graphic novel by Iranian author Marjane Satrapi.

Synopsis
Nasser Ali Khan, a relative of Satrapi's and a renown Tar player, has his cherished instrument broken after a quarrel. The book narrates the last eight days of his life as he lost the will to live, in November 1958 in Tehran.

Publication history
The original French-language version was published in France in 2004 and the English version was translated by Anjali Singh and published by Pantheon Books in 2006, followed by a softcover version in 2009.

Awards
Chicken with Plums won the  Best Album Award (Prix du Meilleur Album) at the Angoulême International Comics Festival in 2005.

Film adaptation

Satrapi directed a film with the same name based on the comic, which debuted at the La Pate theatre in France on October 26, 2011.

References

2004 books
2004 comics debuts
Iranian comics
Persian literature
French graphic novels
Non-fiction graphic novels
Pantheon Books graphic novels
French novels adapted into films